Meinong may refer to:
 Alexius Meinong (1853–1920), Austrian philosopher
 Meinong District, a Hakka district in Kaohsiung, Taiwan